Guido Sutermeister (Intra, November 21, 1883 - Legnano, March 30, 1964) was an Italian engineer and archaeologist.

Biography 
Originally from Intra, Sutermeister began to work in his early twenties in Legnano in the mechanical industry Franco Tosi.

Passionate about archeology, he promoted archaeological research at Altomilanese. Together with Alda Levi Spinazzola (Superintendence for Archaeological Heritage of Lombardia), he recovered the Parabiago plate. His investigations have also revealed numerous tombs of the Golasecca culture. The recovery by Sutermeister of some urns in Canegrate in 1926, led to the discovery of a vast necropolis, whose study has identified a prehistoric civilization which was given the name of Cultura di Canegrate. The systematic excavations of this facies were then carried out from 1953 to 1956 by Ferrante Rittatore Vonwiller.

Literature 
 Attilio Agnoletto: San Giorgio su Legnano - storia, società, ambiente. 1992.

References

 

20th-century Italian engineers
Italian archaeologists
1883 births
1964 deaths
20th-century archaeologists
People from Intra
Golasecca culture